Henry Hewitt may refer to:

 Henry Hewitt (painter) (1818–1879), English landscape painter
 Henry Charles Hewitt (1885–1968), English film actor
 Henry Harwood Hewitt (1874 - 1926), American architect who worked in Denver (including with Maurice Biscoe) and Los Angeles
 William Henry Hewitt (1884–1966), South African soldier and Victoria Cross recipient
 Henry Kent Hewitt (1887–1972), American naval officer
 Col. Henry Hewitt Wood House, a historic home located at Charleston, West Virginia
 Hewitt, Minnesota, named for Henry Hewitt, an early settler
 Henry Hewitt, alias Tokamak, a fictional DC Comics character